Alomar is a surname. Notable people with the surname include:

 Carlos Alomar (born 1951), American guitarist, composer and arranger
 Gabriel Alomar i Villalonga (1873–1941), Spanish poet, essayist, and educator
 Any of three members of a prominent family of Puerto Rican baseball players, all now retired from play:
 Sandy Alomar Sr. (born 1943), second baseman and coach, and family patriarch
 Sandy Alomar Jr. (born 1966), catcher and oldest son of Sandy Sr.
 Roberto Alomar (born 1968), second baseman and younger son of Sandy Sr.